This page is a list of castles and fortified keeps in Portugal, arranged by region (NUTSII Regions and NUTSIII Subregions):

Norte

Alto Trás-os-Montes

 Beacon of Parada (Parada e Sendim da Ribeira, Alfândega da Fé) 
 Castle of Alfândega da Fé (Alfândega da Fé, Alfândega da Fé) 
 Castle of Algoso (Algoso, Campo de Víboras e Uva, Vimioso) 
 Castle of Balsamão (Chacim, Macedo de Cavaleiros) 
 Castle of Bemposta (Bemposta, Mogadouro) 
 Castle of Bragança (Sé, Santa Maria e Meixedo, Bragança) 
 Castle of Chaves (Santa Maria Maior, Chaves)
 Castle of Ervededo (Ervededo, Chaves) 
 Castle of Mau Vizinho (Cimo de Vila da Castanheira, Chaves) 
 Castle of Miranda do Douro (Miranda do Douro, Miranda do Douro) 
 Castle of Mirandela (Mirandela, Mirandela) 
 Castle of Mogadouro (Mogadouro, Valverde, Vale de Porco e Vilar de Rei, Mogadouro) 
 Castle of Monforte de Rio Livre (Águas Frias, Chaves) 
 Castle of Montalegre (Meixedo e Padornelos, Montalegre)
 Castle of Pena de Aguiar (Telões, Vila Pouca de Aguiar)  
 Castle of Penas Róias (Penas Róias, Mogadouro) 
 Castle of Rebordãos (Rebordãos, Bragança) 
 Castle of Santo Estêvão (Santo Estêvão, Chaves)
 Castle of São Ramão (Viade de Baixo e Fervidelas, Montalegre) 
 Castle of Vinhais (Vinhais, Vinhais) 
 Fort de Modorra (Vale Verde, Vinhais) 
 Fortress of Outeiro (Outeiro, Bragança) 
 Watchtower of Alto do Facho (Duas Igrejas, Miranda do Douro) 
 Watchtower of Alto do Pendão (Genísio, Miranda do Douro) 
 Watchtower of Atalaia (Peredo da Bemposta, Mogadouro) 
 Watchtower of Atalaia (Vimioso, Vimioso) 
 Watchtower of Belage (Vila Chã de Braciosa, Miranda do Douro) 
 Watchtower of Candaira (Baçal, Bragança) 
 Watchtower of Escula (Picote, Miranda do Douro) 
 Watchtower of Facho (Malhadas, Miranda do Douro) 
 Watchtower of Facho (Brunhozinho, Castanheira e Sanhoane, Mogadouro) 
 Watchtower of Facho Segundo (Peredo da Bemposta, Mogadouro) 
 Watchtower of Inculas (Cerejais, Alfândega de Fé) 
 Watchtower of Pendão (Póvoa, Miranda do Douro) 
 Watchtower of Pendão (Azinhoso, Mogadouro) 
 Watchtower of Pendão (Castelo Branco, Mogadouro) 
 Watchtower of Pendão (São Martinho do Peso, Mogadouro) 
 Watchtower of Vigia (São Martinho de Angueira, Miranda do Douro)

Ave
 

 Castle of Lanhoso (Póvoa de Lanhoso (Nossa Senhora do Amparo), Póvoa de Lanhoso) 
 Castle of Guimarães (Oliveira, São Paio e São Sebastião, Guimarães)

Cávado

 Castle of Bastuço (Sequeade e Bastuço (São João e Santo Estêvão), Barcelos) 
 Castle of Braga (Braga (São José de São Lázaro e São João do Souto), Braga)
 Castle of Faria (Gilmonde, Barcelos)
 Tower of Barcelos (Barcelos, Vila Boa e Vila Frescainha (São Martinho e São Pedro), Barcelos)

Douro

 Castle of Alva (Poiares, Freixo de Espada à Cinta) 
 Castle of Cabris (Sendim, Tabuaço) 
 Castle of Carrazeda de Ansiães (Lavandeira, Beira Grande e Selores, Carrazeda de Ansiães)
 Castle of Castelo Melhor (Castelo Melhor, Vila Nova de Foz Côa) 
 Castle of Freixo de Espada-à-Cinta (Freixo de Espada à Cinta e Mazouco, Freixo de Espada-à-Cinta)
 Castle of Freixo de Numão (Freixo de Numão, Vila Nova de Foz Côa)
 Castle of Geraldo (Nossa Senhora da Tourega e Nossa Senhora de Guadalupe, Freixo de Espada à Cinta) 
 Castle of Lamego (Lamego (Almacave e Sé), Lamego) 
 Castle of Mós (Mós, Torre de Moncorvo) 
 Castle of Numão (Numão, Vila Nova de Foz Côa) 
 Castle of Penedono (Penedono e Granja, Penedono) 
 Castle of Sernancelhe (Sernancelhe e Sarzeda, Sernancelhe) 
 Castle of Torre de Moncorvo (Torre de Moncorvo, Torre de Moncorvo) 
 Castle of Valença do Douro (Valença do Douro, Tabuaço) 
 Castle of Vila Flor (Vila Flor e Nabo, Vila Flor) 
 Castle of Vila Nova de Foz Côa (Vila Nova de Foz Côa, Vila Nova de Foz Côa) 
 Watchtower of Alfarela (Torre de Moncorvo, Torre de Moncorvo) 
 Watchtower of Atalaia (Almendra, Vila Nova de Foz Côa) 
 Watchtower of Cabeço do Facho (Freixo de Espada à Cinta e Mazouco, Freixo de Espada à Cinta) 
 Watchtower of Custóias (Custóias, Vila Nova de Foz Côa) 
 Watchtower of Facho (Touça, Vila Nova de Foz Côa) 
 Watchtower of Ferronho (Mós, Torre de Moncorvo) 
 Watchtower of Lagoaça (Lagoaça e Fornos, Freixo de Espada à Cinta) 
 Watchtower of Lugar do Fumo (Almendra, Vila Nova de Foz Côa) 
 Watchtower of Pendão (Horta da Vilariço, Torre de Moncorvo)

Entre Douro e Vouga

 Castle of Santa Maria da Feira (Santa Maria da Feira, Travanca, Sanfins e Espargo, Santa Maria da Feira)

Porto

 Walls of D. Fernando/Fernandina Wall (Cedofeita, Santo Ildefonso, Sé, Miragaia, São Nicolau e Vitória, Porto)

Minho-Lima

 Castle of Castro Laboreiro (Castro Laboreiro e Lamas de Mouro, Melgaço)
 Castle of Curutelo (Ardegão, Freixo e Mato, Ponte de Lima)
 Castle of Lapela (Troporiz e Lapela, Monção) 
 Castle of Lindoso (Lindoso, Ponte de Barca) 
 Castle of Melgaço (Vila e Roussas, Melgaço) 
 Castle of Monção (Monção e Troviscoso, Monção)
 Castle of Nóbrega (Sampriz, Ponte da Barca) 
 Castle of Pena da Rainha (Abedim, Monção) 
 Castle of Vila Nova de Cerveira (Vila Nova de Cerveira e Lovelhe, Vila Nova de Cerveira) 
 Walls of Ponte de Lima (Arca e Ponte de Lima, Ponte de Lima) 
 Watchtower of Mata (Vila Nova de Cerveira e Lovelhe, Vila Nova de Cerveira)

Tâmega

 Castle of Aguiar de Sousa (Aguiar de Sousa, Paredes) 
 Castle of Penafiel (Oldrões, Penafiel)

Centro

Baixo Mondego

 Castle of Montemor-o-Velho (Montemor-o-Velho e Gatões, Montemor-o-Velho) 
 Castle of Redondos (Buarcos, Figueira da Foz) 
 Castle of Soure (Soure, Soure) 
 Tower of Bera (Almalaguês, Coimbra)

Beira Interior Norte

 Castle of Aldeira Velha (Sul de Pinhel, Pinhel) 
 Castle of Alfaiates (Alfaiates, Sabugal) 
 Castle of Atalaia (Pinhel, Pinhel)
 Castle of Casteição (Prova e Casteição, Mêda) 
 Castle of Castelo Bom (Castelo Bom, Almeida) 
 Castle of Castelo Mendo (Castelo Mendo, Ade, Monteperobolso e Mesquitela, Almeida) 
 Castle of Celorico da Beira (Celorico (São Pedro e Santa Maria) e Vila Boa do Mondego, Celorico da Beira) 
 Castle of Codesseiro (Codesseiro, Guarda) 
 Castle of Dalva (Escalhão, Figueira de Castelo Rodrigo) 
 Castle of Guarda (Guarda, Guarda) 
 Castle of Linhares (Linhares, Celorico da Beira) 
 Castle of Longroiva (Longrovia, Mêda) 
 Castle of Marialva (Marialva, Mêda) 
 Castle of Monforte (Colmeal e Vilar Torpim, Figueira de Castelo Rodrigo) 
 Castle of Moreira (Arnóia, Celorico de Basto) 
 Castle of Moreira de Rei (Moreira de Rei, Trancoso) 
 Castle of Pinhel (Pinhel, Pinhel) 
 Castle of Ranhados (Ranhados, Mêda) 
 Castle of Sabugal (Sabugal e Aldeia de Santo António, Sabugal) 
 Castle of Sortelha (Sortelha, Sabugal) 
 Castle of Trancoso (Trancoso (São Pedro e Santa Maria) e Souto Maior, Trancoso) 
 Castle of Valhelhas (Valhelas, Guarda) 
 Castle of Vila do Touro (Vila do Touro, Sabugal) 
 Castle of Vilar Maior (Aldeia da Ribeira, Vilar Maior e Badamalos, Sabugal) 
 Castle of Cristóvão de Moura (Castelo Rodrigo, Figueira de Castelo Rodrigo) 
 Clocktower of Celorico da Beira (Celorico (São Pedro e Santa Maria) e Vila Boa do Mondego, Celorico da Beira) 
 Tower of Sentinela (Escalhão, Figueira de Castelo Rodrigo) 
 Watchtower and ruins of Algadores (Algodres, Vale de Alfonsinho e Vilar de Amargo, Figueira de Castelo Rodrigo) 
 Watchtower of Aldeia da Ribeira (Aldeia da Ribeira, Vilar Maior e Badamalos, Sabugal) 
 Watchtower of Almenara (Mata de Lobos, Figueira de Castelo Rodrigo) 
 Watchtower of Alto do Barranco do Pendão (Miuzela e Porto de Ovelha, Almeida) 
 Watchtower of Alto do Facho (Vermisoa, Figueira de Castelo Rodrigo) 
 Watchtower of Atalaia (Malpartida e Vale de Coelha, Almeida) 
 Watchtower of Atalaia (Vilar Formoso, Almeida) 
 Watchtower of Atalaia II (Vilar Formoso, Almeida) 
 Watchtower of Atalaias (Malpartida e Vale de Coelha, Almeida) 
 Watchtower of Cabeço da Atalaia (Alto do Palurdo, Pinhel) 
 Watchtower of Cabeço de Atalaia (Leomil, Mido, Senouras e Aldeia Nova, Almeida) 
 Watchtower of Cabeço do Facho (Almofala e Escarigo, Figueira de Castelo Rodrigo) 
 Watchtower of Castelo Bom (Castelo Bom, Almeida) 
 Watchtower of Moitas (Aldeia da Ribeira, Vilar Maior e Badamalos, Sabugal) 
 Watchtower of Pendão (Prova e Casteição, Mêda) 
 Watchtower of Pendão (Vale do Massueime, Pinhel) 
 Watchtower of Picão da Atalaia (Algodres, Vale de Alfonsinho e Vilar de Amargo, Figueira de Castelo Rodrigo) 
 Watchtower of Póvoa de El-Rei (Vale do Massueime, Pinhel) 
 Watchtower of Sentinela (Junça e Naves, Almeida) 
 Watchtower of Sentinela (Vermisoa, Figueira de Castelo Rodrigo) 
 Watchtower of Tinassa (Vale da Mula, Almeida)

Beira Interior Sul

 Castle of Castelo Branco (Castelo Branco, Castelo Branco) 
 Castle of Idanha-a-Nova (Idanha-a-Nova e Alcafozes, Idanha-a-Nova) 
 Castle of Monsanto (Monsanto e Idanha-a-Velha, Idanha-a-Nova) 
 Castle of Penamacor (Penamacor, Penamacor) 
 Castle of Penha Garcia (Penha Garcia, Idanha-a-Nova) 
 Castle of Rodão (Vila Velha de Ródão, Vila Velha de Ródão) 
 Castle of Salvaterra do Extremo (Monfortinho e Salvaterra do Extremo, Idanha-a-Nova) 
 Castle of Zebreira (Zebreira e Segura, Idanha-a-Nova) 
 Clocktower of Castelo Branco (Castelo Branco, Castelo Branco) 
 Tower of Lucano (Monsanto e Idanha-a-Velha, Idanha-a-Velha) 
 Walls of Idanha-a-Velha (Monsanto e Idanha-a-Velha, Idanha-a-Velha)

Cova da Beira

 Castle of Belmonte (Belmonte e Colmeal da Torre, Belmonte) 
 Castle of Castelo Novo (Castelo Novo, Fundão) 
 Walls of Covilhã (Covilhã e Canhoso, Covilhã)

Dão-Lafões

 Castle of Aguiar da Beira (Aguiar da Beira e Coruche, Aguiar da Beira) 
 Castle of Penalva/Coruto (Castelo de Penalva, Penalva do Castelo) 
 Castle of Prado (Silvã de Cima, Sátão) 
 Castle of Viseu (Viseu, Viseu)
 Tower of Ferreira de Aves (Ferreira de Aves, Sátão

Médio Tejo

 Castle of Abrantes (Abrantes (São Vicente e São João) e Alferrarede, Abrantes) 
 Castle of Almourol (Praia do Ribatejo, Vila Nova da Barquinha) 
 Castle of Ourém (Nossa Senhora das Misericórdias, Ourém) 
 Castle of Tomar (Tomar (São João Baptista) e Santa Maria dos Olivais, Tomar) 
 Castle of Torres Novas (Torres Novas (São Pedro), Lapas e Ribeira Branca, Torre Novas) 
 Ruins of the Tower Palace (Constância, Constância) 
 Tower of Dornes (Nossa Senhora do Pranto, Ferreira de Zêzere) 
 Tower of Langalhão (Areias e Pias, Ferreira de Zêzere)

Oeste

 Castle of Alcobaça (Alcobaça e Vestiaria, Alcobaça) 
 Castle of Alfeizerão (Alfeizerão, Alcobaça) 
 Castle of Atouguia da Baleia (Atouguia da Baleia, Peniche) 
 Castle of Óbidos (Santa Maria, São Pedro e Sobral da Lagoa, Óbidos) 
 Castle of Torres Vedras (Torres Vedras (São Pedro, Santiago, Santa Maria do Castelo e São Miguel) e Matacães, Torres Vedras) 
 Tower of Dom Framondo (Famalicão, Nazaré)

Pinhal Interior Norte

 Castle of Avô (Avô, Oliveira de Hospital) 
 Castle of Germanelo (São Miguel, Santa Eufémia e Rabaçal, Penela) 
 Castle of Lousã (Lousã e Vilarinho, Lousã) 
 Castle of Penela (São Miguel, Santa Eufémia e Rabaçal, Penela)

Pinhal Interior Sul

 Castle of Amêndoa (Amêndoa, Mação) 
 Castle of Sertã (Sertã, Sertã)

Pinhal Litoral

 Castle of Leiria (Leiria, Pousos, Barreira e Cortes, Leiria) 
 Castle of Pombal (Pombal, Pombal) 
 Castle of Porto de Mós (Porto de Mós (São João Baptista e São Pedro), Porto de Mós) 
 Castle of Redinha (Redinha, Pombal) 
 Castle of Folgosinho (Folgosinho, Gouveia)

Lisbon

Greater Lisbon

 Castle of Alenquer (Alenquer (Santo Estêvão e Triana), Alenquer) 
 Castle of Cascais (Cascais e Estoril, Cascais) 
 Castle of Colares (Colares, Sintra) 
 Castle of São Jorge (Santa Maria Maior, Lisboa) 
 Castle of the Moors (Sintra (Santa Maria e São Miguel, São Martinho e São Pedro de Penaferrim), Sintra) 
 Castle of Vila Verde dos Francos (Vila Verde dos Francos, Alenquer) 
 Tower of Largo do Terreirinho (Sacavém e Prior Velho, Loures) 
 Watchtower of Boca do Inferno (Cascais e Estoril, Cascais)

Península of Setúbal

 Castle of Almada (Almada, Cova da Piedade, Pragal e Cacilhas, Almada)
 Castle of Palmela (Palmela, Palmela)
 Castle of Sesimbra (Sesimbra (Castelo), Sesimbra) 
 Castle of Sines (Sines, Sines)

Alentejo

Alentejo Central

 Castle of Alandroal (Alandroal (Nossa Senhora da Conceição), São Brás dos Matos (Mina do Bugalho) e Juromenha (Nossa Senhora do Loreto), Alandroal) 
 Castle of Arraiolos (Arraiolos, Arraiolos) 
 Castle of Azinhalinho (Corval, Reguengos de Monsaraz) 
 Castle of Borba (Borba (Matriz), Borba) 
 Castle of Degebe (Reguengos de Monsaraz, Reguengos de Monsaraz)
 Castle of Estremoz (Estremoz (Santa Maria e Santo André), Estremoz) 
 Castle of Evoramonte (Évora Monte (Santa Maria), Estremoz) 
 Castle of Guimarães (Oliveira, São Paio e São Sebastião, Évora) 
 Castle of Juromenha (Alandroal (Nossa Senhora da Conceição), São Brás dos Matos (Mina do Bugalho) e Juromenha (Nossa Senhora do Loreto), Alandroal)
 Castle of Mourão (Mourão, Mourão)
 Castle of Monsaraz (Monsaraz, Reguengos de Monsaraz)
 Castle of Montemor-o-Novo (Nossa Senhora da Vila, Nossa Senhora do Bispo e Silveiras, Montemor-o-Novo) 
 Castle of Pontega (Igrejinha, Portel) 
 Castle of Portel (Portel, Portel) 
 Castle of Redondo (Redondo, Redondo) 
 Castle of Terena (Terena (São Pedro), Alandroal) 
 Castle of Valongo (Nossa Senhora de Machede, Évora) 
 Castle of Veiros (Veiros, Estremoz) 
 Castle of Viana do Alentejo (Viana do Alentejo, Viana do Alentejo) 
 Castle of Vila Viçosa (Nossa Senhora da Conceição e São Bartolomeu, Vila Viçosa) 
 Watchtower of Cabeço do Mouro (Nossa Senhora da Graça do Divor, Évora) 
 Watchtower of Frandina (Estremoz (Santa Maria e Santo André), Estremoz) 
 Watchtower of São Gens do Xarez (Monsaraz, Reguengos de Monsaraz) 
 Watchtower of Vale de Boim (Portel, Portel)

Alentejo Litoral

 Castle of Alcácer do Sal (Alcácer do Sal (Santa Maria do Castelo e Santiago) e Santa Susana, Alcácer do Sal) 
 Castle of Odemira (São Salvador e Santa Maria, Odemira) 
 Castle of Santiago do Cacém (Santiago do Cacém, Santa Cruz e São Bartolomeu da Serra, Santiago do Cacém)

Alto Alentejo

 Castle of Alegrete (Alegrete, Portalegre) 
 Castle of Alpalhão (Alpalhão, Nisa) 
 Castle of Alter do Chão (Alter do Chão, Alter do Chão) 
 Castle of Alter Pedroso (Alter do Chão, Alter do Chão) 
 Castle of Amieira (Arez e Amieira do Tejo, Nisa) 
 Castle of Assumar (Assumar, Monforte) 
 Castle of Avis (Avis, Avis) 
 Castle of Barbacena (Barbacena e Vila Fernando, Elvas) 
 Castle of Belver (Belver, Gavião) 
 Castle of Cabeço de Vide (Cabeço de Vide, Fronteira) 
 Castle of Campo Maior (São João Baptista, Campo Maior)
 Castle of Castelo de Vide (Santa Maria de Devassa, Castelo de Vide)
 Castle of Crato (Crato e Mártires, Flor da Rosa e Vale do Peso, Crato)
 Castle of Elvas (Caia, São Pedro e Alcáçova, Elvas) 
 Castle of Fontalva (Santa Eulália, Elvas) 
 Castle of Lousa (Luz, Mourão)
 Castle of Marvão (Santa Maria de Marvão, Portalegre) 
 Castle of Monforte (Monforte, Monforte) 
 Castle of Montalvão (Montalvão, Nisa) 
 Castle of Nisa (Espírito Santo, Nossa Senhora da Graça e São Simão, Nisa) 
 Castle of Ouguela (São João Baptista, Campo Maior)
 Castle of Portalegre (Sé e São Lourenço, Portalegre) 
 Castle of Seda (Seda, Alter do Chão) 
 Castle of Torrejão (Reguengo e São Julião, Portalegre) 
 Castle of Vila Boim (Terrugem e Vila Boim, Elvas) 
 Watchtower of Atalaião (Sé e São Lourenço, Portalegre) 
 Watchtower of Baldio de Arronches (Assunção, Arronches)

Baixo Alentejo

 Castle of Aljustrel (Aljustrel e Rio de Moinhos, Aljustrel) 
 Castle of Alvito (Alvito, Alvito) 
 Castle of Beja (Beja (Santiago Maior e São João Baptista), Beja) 
 Castle of Mértola (Mértola, Mertóla) 
 Castle of Messejana (Messejana, Aljustrel) 
 Castle of Moura (Moura (Santo Agostinho e São João Baptista) e Santo Amador, Moura) 
 Castle of Noudar (Barrancos, Barrancos) 
 Castle of Ourique (Ourique, Ourique) 
 Castle of Serpa (Serpa (Salvador e Santa Maria), Serpa) 
 Castle of Vidigueria (Vidigueira, Vidigueira) 
 Clocktower of Serpa (Serpa (Salvador e Santa Maria), Serpa) 
 Watchtower of Cabeça Magra (Moura (Santo Agostinho e São João Baptista) e Santo Amador, Moura)

Lezíria do Tejo

 Castle of Alcanede (Alcanede, Santarém)
 Castle of Santarém (Santarém (Marvila), Santa Iria da Ribeira de Santarém, Santarém (São Salvador) e Santarém (São Nicolau), Santarém)

Algarve

 Castle of Albufeira (Albufeira e Olhos de Água, Albufeira) 
 Castle of Alcoutim (Alcoutim e Pereiro, Alcoutim) 
 Castle of Alcantarilha (Alcantarilha e Pêra, Silves) 
 Castle of Alcoutim (Old) (Alcoutim e Pereiro, Alcoutim) 
 Castle of Aljezur (Aljezur, Aljezur) 
 Castle of Alvor (Alvor, Portimão) 
 Castle of Castro Marim (Castro Marim, Castro Marim) 
 Castle of Estômbar (Estômbar e Parchal, Lagoa) 
 Castle of Senhora da Luz (Luz, Lagos)
 Castle of Loulé (Loulé (São Sebastião), Loulé) 
 Castle of Paderne (Paderne, Albufeira) 
 Castle of Salir (Salir, Loulé) 
 Castle of Silves (Silves, Silves) 
 Castle of Tavira (Tavira (Santa Maria e Santiago), Tavira) 
 Fortress of Faro (Faro (Sé e São Pedro), Faro) 
 Tower of Aires (Luz de Tavira e Santo Estêvão, Tavira) 
 Tower of Aspa (Vila do Bispo e Raposeira, Vila do Bispo) 
 Tower of Atalaia (Luz, Lagos) 
 Tower of Guia (Guia, Albufeira) 
 Tower of Medronheira (Ferreiras, Albufeira) 
 Watchtower of Ponta do Altar (Ferragudo, Lagoa)

Madeira

 Fort of São Bento da Ribeira Brava (Ribeira Brava, Ribeira Brava) 
 Tower of Bom Despacho (Campanário, Ribeira Brava) 
 Tower of Capitão (Santo António, Funchal)

Azores

 Tower/Bartizan of Porto Pim (Angústias, Horta)

See also
Castles in Portugal

 
Castles
Portugal
Portugal
Castles

pt:Anexo:Lista de fortificações de Portugal